Francis "The Pocket Battleship" Ampofo (born 5 June 1967) is a Ghanaian born British former professional boxer who competed from 1990 to 2002. He challenged once for the WBO flyweight title in 1994. At regional level, he held the British flyweight title twice between 1991 and 1994, and the Commonwealth flyweight title twice between 1993 and 1995.

References

External links

1967 births
Bantamweight boxers
Flyweight boxers
Ghanaian male boxers
Living people
Footballers from Kumasi
Super-bantamweight boxers
Super-flyweight boxers
British male boxers